The Wilkes-Barre Barons were a minor league baseball team that existed on and off from 1886 to 1955. They began as an unnamed team in the Pennsylvania State Association in 1886.

The following season the team was known as the Wilkes-Barre Coal Barons and played in the Central League in 1888, but the league disbanded after that season. Two Wilkes-Barre team took the field in 1889 and 1892, with the later sharing representation with Pittsburgh, as Wilkes-Barre Coal Barons/Pittsburgh in the record books. The team then played from 1893 until 1898 in the Eastern League, and from 1898 to 1900 in the Atlantic League.

After spending the 1902 season in the Pennsylvania State League, as Wilkes-Barre/Mount Carmel. Their next incarnation came about in 1905, when they began playing in the New York State League, as the Wilkes-Barre Barons. They played in that league until 1917. From 1923 to 1937, they played in the New York–Pennsylvania League and from 1938 to 1948 they played in the Eastern League. Until 1939, they did not have any affiliations, however from 1939 to 1951 they were affiliated with the Cleveland Indians. The team was briefly named the Wilkes-Barre Indians from 1949 to 1951 and were managed by Bill Norman. They won a league championship in 1950 and made the league playoffs each year they played between 1949 and 1951.

From 1953 to 1955 the team regained the Barons name and once again played in the Eastern League, and in 1954 they were affiliated with the Chicago White Sox. In 1955, they were affiliated with the New York Giants when the franchise moved midseason to become the Johnstown Johnnies.

The ballpark

One ballpark they played their home games at was Artillery Park.

Notable alumni
Multiple notable players spent time with the team, including:

Baseball Hall of Fame alumni
 Tony Lazzeri (1943, MGR) Inducted, 1991
 Bob Lemon (1940-1941) Inducted, 1976
 Joe McCarthy (1912-1914, 1916) Inducted, 1957

Notable alumni
 Ray Boone (1946) 2 x MLB All-Star
 Frank Brannan,
 Bob Bruce (1954)
 Leon Cadore (1912)
 Bill Dietrich (1932)
 Hank Edwards (1941)
 Nick Etten (1936) MLB All-Star; 1940 AL Home Run Leader
 Elbie Fletcher (1935) MLB All-Star
 Alex Ferguson (1932)
 Buck Freeman (1893)
 Mike Garcia (1946-1947) 3 x MLB All-Star; 1954 AL ERA Title
 Doug Hansen,
 Jim Hegan (1940) 5 x MLB All-Star
 Dave Hoskins (1950-1951)
 Sam Jones (1950) 2 x MLB All-Star; 1959 NL ERA Title
 Bob Kuzava (1946)
 Brooks Lawrence (1951) MLB All-Star
 Danny Litwhiler (1953) MLB All-Star
 Don Mossi (1951) MLB All-Star
 Ray Narleski (1948) 2 x MLB All-Star
 Johnny Niggeling (1933)
 Bill Norman (1947-1951, MGR)
 Dave Pope (1950-1951)
 Allie Reynolds (1962) 6 x MLB All-Star; 1952 AL ERA Title
 Jack Scott (1931)
 Jose Santiago (1950-1951)
 Joe Shaute (1938)
 Harry Simpson (1949) MLB All-Star
 Al Smith (1948-1949) 3 x MLB All-Star
 Scott Stratton (1900) 1890 ERA Title
 Fred Thomas (1948) Outfielder, first black player in the Eastern League
 Hal White (1939)
 Gene Woodling (1942-1943) MLB All-Star
 Heinie Zimmerman (1907) 1912 NL Triple Crown

Year-by-year record

References

Sports in the Scranton–Wilkes-Barre metropolitan area
Baseball teams established in 1888
Baseball teams disestablished in 1955
1888 establishments in Pennsylvania
1955 disestablishments in Pennsylvania
Defunct minor league baseball teams
Defunct baseball teams in Pennsylvania
Defunct Eastern League (1938–present) teams
Chicago White Sox minor league affiliates
Cleveland Guardians minor league affiliates
New York Giants minor league affiliates